Přelouč is a town in Pardubice District in the Pardubice Region of the Czech Republic. It has about 9,300 inhabitants.

Administrative parts
Villages of Klenovka, Lhota, Lohenice, Mělice, Škudly, Štěpánov and Tupesy are administrative parts of Přelouč. Tupesy forms an exclave of the municipal territory.

Etymology
The name is derived from Czech přes louku, i.e. "across the meadow". It refers to the place where people walked across the meadows.

Geography

It lies on the border between the Svitavy Uplands and the East Elbe Table. It is located on the left bank of the Elbe in the Polabí region.

There are several water bodies in the municipal territory. North of the town are flooded gravel quarries, which today are used mainly for recreation and water sports. North of the town is also the fish pond Buňkov, the largest water body of Přelouč. In the urban area there is the small Račanský Pond.

History
Přelouč is one of the oldest historically documented settlements in the region. A settlement for probably founded here in the 10th century. The first written mention of Přelouč dates back to 1086 when the village became a part of the Benedictine monastery in Opatovice nad Labem. It was owned by the monastery for 300 years. 

In 1261, Přelouč was promoted to a market town by King Ottokar II of Bohemia. Since then, the town has used its coat of arms which consists of a black gridiron in the golden field. This symbol is associated with Saint Lawrence who lived in the 3rd century in Rome and was burnt alive on a gridiron. Because of the town's affiliation with the Benedictine monastery dedicated to Saint Lawrence, the town coat of arms includes the gridiron.

Thanks to its location, Přelouč was an important strategic transit place in the 13th and 14th centuries. During the Hussite Wars, Přelouč was conquered and badly damaged. As a result, its importance declined and it became a small agricultural market town. In 1518, it was joined to the Pardubice estate. New economical and cultural development occurred in the second half of the 16th century and in 1580, it was promoted to a town by Rudolf II.

The War of the Austrian Succession again damaged the town, which again became a small agricultural town. It was not until the first half of the 19th century, thanks to the construction of a new imperial road and then the railway, that Přelouč became the second most economically important town in the region. From 1850 to 1960, Přelouč was a district town.

Demographics

Economy
The largest employer is the industrial company Kiekert-CS. The production plant of the multinational company was founded in Přelouč in 1993 and focuses on the production of closure systems for the automotive industry.

Culture
František Filipovský Award is a film and television dubbing ceremony award held in Přelouč since 1994. This ceremony aims to increase the prestige of this artistic discipline and to popularize artists who excel in this field. It commemorates the actor and voice actor František Filipovský, a local native.

Sights

The most significant building is the Church of Saint James the Great. It was originally built in the Romanesque style. After it was damaged by fire in 1641, it was renovated in the Baroque style in 1646.

The cemetery Church of the Visitation of the Virgin Mary was built in the Baroque style in 1684. Its interior is decorated with paintings by Josef Kramolín.

The former Civil Savings Bank is a Neo-Renaissance building from 1899–1901 and the Neo-Renaissance building of the elementary school from 1880–1881 are landmarks of the town square and whole town.

The Hydroelectric Power Station on the Elbe has been working since 1924 and is a technical monument. It has an installed capacity of 2,340 kW.

Notable people
Ladislav Quis (1846–1913), poet and writer; lived here
František Dvořák (1862–1927), painter
Rudolf Bruner-Dvořák (1864–1921), photographer
František Flos (1864–1961), writer
František Filipovský (1907–1993), actor and voice actor
Jiřina Petrovická (1923–2008), actress; raised here
Stanislav Brebera (1925–2012), chemist, Semtex inventor

Gallery

References

External links

 

Cities and towns in the Czech Republic
Populated places in Pardubice District